And After That, We Didn't Talk is the second mixtape from American rapper GoldLink. It was released in November 2015 on Soulection, following his critically acclaimed debut mixtape, The God Complex. The mixtape features guest appearances from Anderson .Paak and Masego. The project's production was handled by Louie Lastic, Merg, Galimatias, McCallaman, Braeden Bailey, Medasin, Milo Mills, Demo-Tapped, Tom Misch, and Jordan Rakei.

And After That, We Didn't Talk received widespread acclaim for its production and unique storytelling and spawned two singles: "Dance On Me" and "Spectrum".

Background
Shortly after the release and critical acclaim of his debut mixtape, The God Complex, Goldlink signed with LA record label Soulection and began working on his second mixtape. In 2015, Goldlink was selected as part of the 2015 XXL Freshman class, and it was announced that he would be working with acclaimed producer Rick Rubin. He later released the song "Spectrum" as the debut single for the mixtape. It was later revealed that Rick Rubin would be his mentor and executive producer for the album.

Composition
In an interview on Soulection Radio with DJ, host, and mixtape executive producer Joe Kay, GoldLink said that the mixtape is a concept album based around a breakup he suffered at the age of 16: he says it was due to neither of them truly knowing how to properly handle a relationship. He also noted that this breakup is what led to the events that took place within The God Complex, calling it his "memoir or moment of clarity". He stated that the writing for some of the songs are inspired by either conversations or ex-relationships. The mixtape features personal reflections on themes such as love, coming of age, obsession, intimacy, regret, police brutality, substance abuse, racism, and parenthood. Just like his previous project, the mixtape incorporates a blended style of hip hop and electronic. With the help of numerous producers among the Soulection roster, he was able to additionally blend jazz fusion and neo soul into his trademark style.

Critical reception
The mixtape received positive reviews from critics and fans alike. Music review aggregate site Metacritic scored the project a 72. Pitchfork's Matthew Strauss gave the mixtape a 7.3, stating that "[Goldlink's] music works when every element blends together, and And After That, We Didn't Talk is most interesting when he shares only the most vital details from a moment. It's then that he can wring his experiences for their emotions and convey feelings with more than just words." SPIN magazine's Sheldon Pearce scored the mixtape 7 out of 10, stating "[t]here are a few strong sonic ties to God Complex, specifically the works of producer Louie Lastic, but this album has greater balance. The full spectrum of sound explored is even richer this time around." Kevin Ritchie from NOW rated the mixtape an 80 and stated "Even with quick, dense and precisely rhythmic flows, his rapping is like verbal dancing. Its joyous and romantic moments make the album feel more like a thematic refinement than a musical one."

Track listing

Notes
 "See I Miss" features additional vocals from Anderson .Paak

Sample credits
 "Late Night" samples "Kolors" by Monte Booker and Smino
 "Dance on Me" samples "My Place" by Tweet
 "Palm Trees" interpolates "Fantasy" by Alina Baraz & Galimatias
 "Spectrum" features a vocal sample of "She's a Bitch" by Missy Elliott

Remixed version
To celebrate Goldlink's signing to RCA Records, he and Soulection released a remix version of And After That, We Didn't Talk, with production handled by producers not featured on the original album, most of which are among the Soulection roster.

References

2015 mixtape albums
GoldLink albums